The University of Western Sydney Law Review (previously Macarthur Law Review) is an annual peer-reviewed law review published by the University of Western Sydney School of Law.

External links 
 

Australian law journals
Annual journals
English-language journals
Law Review
Publications established in 1997